John Dawson Watson  (20 May 1832 – 3 January 1892) was a British painter, watercolorist, and illustrator.

He was educated King Edward VI Grammar School, Sedbergh School and Manchester School of Design. His son was the Impressionist painter Dawson Dawson-Watson.
His daughter, Francis, married Myles Birkett Foster in 1864.

Work
Watson exhibited at the Royal Academy from 1853 to 1890, the British Institution, the Society of British Artists Suffolk Street, Royal Watercolour Society, and the Grosvenor Gallery. He was famous for his paintings of genre scenes, often of children. His pictures were usually small, painted on panel or board, and showed a Pre-Raphaelite feeling for colour and detail. He was also a prolific and notable illustrator, producing many designs for books and periodicals. He worked for Once a Week, Good Words, London Society and others; among the many books he illustrated were Pilgrim's Progress, Arabian Nights, and Watt's Diine and Floral Songs. Works by him are in the Victoria and Albert Museum, Norwich and Liverpool.

References

External links
John Dawson Watson (1832-1892) - The Victorian Web

1832 births
1892 deaths
19th-century English painters
English male painters
19th-century English male artists